Lecointea ovalifolia is a flowering plant of the family Fabaceae found exclusively in Peru.

References

Exostyleae
Vulnerable plants
Trees of Peru
Taxonomy articles created by Polbot